Uruguayan Americans (or ) are Americans of Uruguayan ancestry or birth. The American Community Survey of 2006 estimated the Uruguayan American population to number 50,538, a figure that notably increased a decade later.

Similar to the neighboring country of Argentina, Uruguay took in many immigrants from Europe beginning in the late 19th century and lasting until the mid-20th century. As it stands, approximately 93% of Uruguay's population is of European descent  with Italians, Spaniards, Portuguese, French, and Germans being among the most populous groups to have settled in the country. Because of this, many Uruguayan Americans identify both with their nationality and their family's country of origin.

History 
The history of Uruguayan emigration to the United States is very recent. Before 1960, Uruguayan living conditions were favorable, with many job opportunities, good education and a good healthcare system. The few Uruguayans that left the country migrated to other Latin American countries such as Argentina. For this reason, Uruguayan emigration to the United States was low during that period.

After 1960, welfare in the life of Uruguay fell. This was due to the emergence of serious economic and political problems after World War II, particularly money crises and unemployment during the decades of the 1960s and 1970s. Moreover, Uruguay was ruled by an oppressive military regime for approximately a decade starting in 1973. All this led to a major Uruguayan emigration, which included large numbers of well-educated professionals and the young. This migration also contributed to a social security crisis, as the population aged and young working people migrated to other countries. This grew the burden on the country's financial resources.

Of the Uruguayan immigrants from 1963 to 1975, most were young; only 14.3 percent of the migrants were over 40 years old. The continued unemployment problem of the late 1980s developed yet another impetus for the youth of Uruguay to seek employment and new lives in other countries. Some of them went to the United States, but the majority of Uruguayan emigrants continued to migrate to Argentina.

Culture and socioeconomics 
Most Uruguayans find it easy to adapt to life in large cities in the United States, thanks to the cosmopolitan lifestyle they are used to in Uruguay. Uruguayans in general have a multilingual exposure that makes English not an obstacle for adaptation in American society. In addition, the high value that is given to higher education has led many Uruguayan students to migrate to the United States to continue their University studies there.

Demographics 

According to the 2010 census on the Uruguayan descent population in the U.S., there are about 56,884 people of that origin. The majority of Uruguayans that migrated to the United States arrived in the 1960s and 1970s. It is estimated that, between 1963 and 1975 (when the country's economy suffered a huge drop), 180,000 Uruguayans left the country.  Later on, between 1973 and 1985, during the period of oppressive military control, 150,000 Uruguayans left Uruguay. And, in 1989, only 16,000 of these citizens had returned to their native country. When these two figures are added together, the migration figure stands at approximately one-tenth of the population of Uruguay.

Although in the 1990s Uruguayans constituted 43 percent of all immigrants to the United States originating from Latin America and the Caribbean, they only made up a small part of the large U.S. Latino population. Most Uruguayan immigrants established themselves in New York City, New Jersey, and Long Island. Two other remarkable centers for Uruguayan American population are Washington, D.C., and Florida.

The states with the largest population of Uruguayans (Source: 2010 Census)

  - 14,542 (0.1% of state population)
  - 10,902 (0.1% of state population)
  - 6,021 (less than 0.1% of state population)
  - 4,110 (less than 0.1% of state population)
  - 2,708 (less than 0.1% of state population)
  - 2,566 (less than 0.1% of state population)
  - 2,317 (less than 0.1% of state population)
  - 1,594 (less than 0.1% of state population)
  - 1,294 (0.1% of state population)
  - 1,282 (less than 0.1% of state population)
  - 1,181 (less than 0.1% of state population)

The cities with the largest population of Uruguayans (Source: 2010 Census)
 New York, NY - 3,004 (less than 0.1%)
 Elizabeth, NJ - 2,553 (2.0%)
 Miami, FL - 1,040 (0.3%)
 Miami Beach, FL - 958 (1.1%)
 Leominster, MA - 824 (2.0%)
 West Orange, NJ - 733 (1.6%)
 Los Angeles - 697 (less than 0.1%)
 Fitchburg, MA - 650 (1.6%)
 Houston, TX - 642 (less than 0.1%)
 Newark, NJ - 634 (0.2%)
 Orange, NJ - 445 (1.5%)
 Hackettstown, NJ - 498 (0.4%)

Notable people

 Bruno Fonseca - (1958 – 1994) American artist who shifted between abstract and figurative styles and worked in both painting and sculpture. His father, Gonzalo Fonseca, was also a Uruguayan sculptor.
 Joseph Jacinto "Jo" Mora (1876 – 1947), Uruguayan-born cartoonist, illustrator and cowboy who lived with the Hopi
 Emir Rodríguez Monegal - (1921 – 1985) Uruguayan scholar, literary critic, writer and publisher of Latin American literature
 Miguel Terekhov - (1928 – 2012) Uruguayan-born American ballet dancer and ballet instructor.
 Alejandro Zaffaroni (1923 - 2014), Uruguayan-born serial entrepreneur in the biotechnological field
 Jonathan Del Arco - Uruguayan-born American actor
 Miguel del Águila - Uruguayan-born multiple Grammy nominated American composer
 Fernando Clavijo - Former soccer player
 Natalia Cigliuti - American actress
 Fernando Espuelas - Uruguayan born, American naturalized entrepreneur, author, media personality and philanthropist
 Diego Fagúndez (born 1995 in Montevideo), professional soccer player for the New England Revolution of Major League Soccer
 Francisco Fattoruso - musician born in Las Vegas, Nevada, son of Hugo Fattoruso
 Pepe Fernández - Uruguayan former soccer player.
 Caio Fonseca -  American painter. He is brother of Bruno Fonseca
 Isabel Fonseca - American writer
 Enrique Graf - Uruguayan born, American naturalized Musician
 Jorge Majfud - Uruguayan writer, professor at Jacksonville University
Martín Núñez - Uruguayan soccer player currently playing for Minnesota Stars FC in the North American Soccer League. the Florida State Final Four MVP and the Miami Herald Player of the Year as he led the team with thirty-four goals.
 Pedro Piedrabuena - American professional three-cushion billiards player
 Daniel Pontet - Uruguayan-born artist working in the U.S.
 Tab Ramos - former soccer player, whom also served as co-assistant to U.S. team coach Bob Bradley from 2007-2011.
 Gabe Saporta - vocalist of bands Midtown and Cobra Starship
 Pedro Sevcec - television reporter who works for America TV / Miami in the United States
 Martin Sorrondeguy - singer of bands Los Crudos and Limp Wrist, the founder of the DIY record label, Lengua Armada Discos, documentary film director and a prominent figure in both the straight edge scene and the queercore scene. He is a Uruguayan born and American raised.
 Carlos A. Vegh -  Uruguayan academic economist and Professor of Economics at the University of Maryland.
 Agustín Viana - American-born, Uruguayan professional soccer player
Rafael Viñoly - Uruguayan architect living in the United States
 Ida Vitale - prolific writer from Montevideo who played an important role in the Uruguayan art movement "Generation of 1945".
 Adrian Vallarino - TV and Film producer and director born in Uruguay working in the United States

See also

 List of Uruguayan Americans
 White Latino Americans
 White Latin Americans
 Americans in Uruguay
 United States–Uruguay relations

References

Further reading
 Spear, Jane E. "Uruguayan Americans." Gale Encyclopedia of Multicultural America, edited by Thomas Riggs, (3rd ed., vol. 4, Gale, 2014), pp. 475-483. online

External links
  Uruguayan-American Foundation (UAF)

+
Hispanic and Latino American
 
American